Austrarchaea smithae is a species of spider in the family Archaeidae. It is commonly known as the Blue Mountains Assassin Spider as the holotype male was found at Mount Wilson in the Blue Mountains National Park. It was named to honour Dr Helen Smith. It is endemic to Australia.

References 

Spiders described in 2011
Archaeidae
Taxa named by Michael G. Rix